The Bush Tramway Club is a heritage railway  west of Huntly along the Rotowaro Road, in the Waikato region of New Zealand. It regularly operates restored locomotives along a  Rotowaro-Glen Afton section of the former Glen Afton Branch.  Open days are the first Sunday of each month.

The Bush Tramway Club was founded in 1965 to preserve equipment from New Zealand's former bush tramways and light industrial lines, railway lines which were used to remove timber from the bush and transport coal from mines to dairy factories. It obtained use of the Rotowaro-Glen Afton section in 1974 and has since purchased most of the rail corridor land. The Glen Afton Branch Line, a former New Zealand Railways (NZR) branch line to the Pukemiro coal mine was opened in 1915 and closed in 1973.

The locomotives include geared Climax and Heisler locomotives (formerly used on the Ellis and Burnand Tramway, Ongarue), a NZR F class locomotive number 185, several diesel shunting locomotives used by the NZR and industrial lines, and some jiggers.

Locomotives and Rolling Stock

NZR Steam Locomotives

Industrial Steam Locomotives

 The rear bogie of Hawthorn Leslie 3663 of 1927 is held by the club.

NZR Diesel Locomotives

The frame of FA 41 is held by the club. Converted to diesel in 1964.

Industrial Diesel Locomotives

Battery Locomotives

Motor Jiggers

Bush Jiggers

Former Industrial Diesel Locomotives

External links 

 Bush Tramway Club

References 

Rail transport in Waikato
Heritage railways in New Zealand
Tourist attractions in Waikato
Logging railways in New Zealand